Tornatellides subperforata is a species of minute, air-breathing land snail, a terrestrial pulmonate gastropod mollusk or micromollusk, in the family Achatinellidae. It is one of over 50 species in the genus Tornatellides.

References

 Powell A. W. B., New Zealand Mollusca, William Collins Publishers Ltd, Auckland, New Zealand 1979 

subperforata
Gastropods of New Zealand
Gastropods described in 1909